Griswold High School may refer to one of these U.S. schools:

Griswold High School (Connecticut)
Griswold High School (Helix, Oregon)
Griswold High School (Iowa)